The Wushi'er Bingfang, or Recipes for Fifty-Two Ailments, is an ancient Chinese medical text that was discovered in 1973 in Mawangdui in a tomb that was sealed in 168 BCE under the Han dynasty. The text was copied in seal script on sheets of silk around 215 BCE, under the Qin dynasty, but might have dated from even earlier. Modern editors chose its title because the text starts with a list of fifty-two ailments for which recipes are given. The formulary presents more than 250 exorcistic and drug-based cures for ailments such as warts, hemorrhoids, inguinal swellings, and snake bites. Among other medical treatments, the text also recommends lancing and cauterization, but mention neither acupuncture nor moxibustion (cauterization with moxa).

With roughly 9,950 characters, Wushi'er bingfang is the longest of the medical texts that have been found in ancient Chinese tombs. Along with other excavated manuscripts (from Zhangjiashan and Wuwei, among others), it has shed light on the early development of Chinese medicine. It illustrates, for instance, that magical incantations were a common therapeutic method among the social elite of the time. And because it shows the development of channel theory in a primitive stage and does not mention the doctrine of Yinyang and the Five Phases, it has pushed historians to date the more sophisticated Huangdi Neijing (Yellow Emperor's Inner Canon) to the first century BCE.

The original manuscript of Wushi'er bingfang is kept at the Hunan Provincial Museum in Changsha.

See also
Rishu

Notes

Bibliography

.
.
.
.
.
.

Chinese medical texts
History of ancient medicine
Medical manuals